Escape from Scorpion Island is a BAFTA-nominated BBC children's TV adventure game show in which contestants compete to "escape from an exotic island". Series 5 was produced by Foundation/Freehand for CBBC and the Australian Broadcasting Corporation.

Series 5 was filmed in the Tallebudgera Valley in Queensland, Australia and is hosted by Myleene Klass and Johny Pitts. It premiered in Australia on 11 March 2011 and ran from Monday to Friday on ABC3.  The series ran in the UK, with the 30 minute version being shown from the 20 June 2011 until 25 July 2011, it started on BBC Two due to Wimbledon coverage but after Wimbledon finished it moved onto BBC One.  The 60 minute version is being shown once a week every Saturday starting from Saturday 25 June 2011.

Synopsis
Long ago, an adventurer came from far across the seas. He was the Fortune Hunter whose mission it was to plunder the Island of its legendary treasure. He took on the Island Challenges and succeeded, winning all of the treasure. However, he failed in his final escape. The Island, furious over the fact he tried to defeat it, took its revenge and mischievously captured the Fortune Hunter's soul and locked it away in a treasure chest. Now, ten other adventurers from modern time must follow the path that he created, their mission - to escape from Scorpion Island and free the fortune hunters soul.

Contestants

There are 10 adventurers on the island; 6 from the UK, 4 from Australia. The Australian adventurers are Dilhan, Lizzie, Natty and Peter.

Starting Teams
Girls (Green) (Tree Camp)
Eleanor Yearsley, 11
Jeremy Koshy, 11 (Captured by the Island on Day 3) (Won back by the Girls on Day 4)
Khadie Fall, 12
Elizabeth "Lizzie" Mackinnon, 13
Natanya "Natty" Elizabeth, 12

Boys (Navy) (River Camp) 
Dilhan Otay, 13
James Jones, 13
Jordan Hendy, 11
Peter Ngo, 12
Zachary "Zach" Tong, 12 (Captured by the Island on Day 3) (Won back by the Boys on Day 4)

Final Teams

Sting  (Red) (Tree Camp) Winners
Natty (Silver Crab- Won in The Divider & Vampire Bat- Won in the Jig Zag; first team captain of Sting)
Peter (Scorpion- Won in Vanishing Point & Clam- Won in Tower Of Stones)
Jordan (Cactus- Won in Under Fire & Coral Sponge- Won in Hard Wired)
Khadie (Butterfly- Won in Flight of Fear)
Jeremy (Venus Flytrap- Won in Double Crossing)

Claw (Yellow) (River Camp)  
James (no treasure; first team captain of Claw)
Zach (Silver Eagle- Won in Chasm of Chaos)
Dilhan (Conch Shell- Won in Sinking Swamp)
Lizzie (Silver Pit Viper- Won in Moving Target)
Eleanor (no treasure)

Gaming Elements

The Memory Trial - This only happens during Day 2-5 on the island. The first part involves piecing together the broken symbol ring. Whichever two contestants who piece the pieces together in the quickest time proceeds into the next round. Here, the contestants have a set time limit to remember as many symbols as possible. After this time, the adventurers look away, and a puzzle awaits them. It is either identifying the incorrect symbols, finding a symbol which has changed, returning missing symbols and more. If successful, they will have the advantage, which is usually a choice of going first or second.
The Code Cracker - Every day, the fortune hunter attempts to help the teams, but the island is furious, and smashes his symbol ring into pieces. The first part of the challenge is to piece together the parts of the symbol ring, same as part 1 of memory trial. The two contestants who do this in the fastest time get to proceed into the second round. Here, the fortune hunter's symbol ring is placed on a rotating wheel, and the task is to decipher the message that the fortune hunter gives by spinning the symbol ring and aligning a letter with a symbol. If successful, their team receives an advantage. If unsuccessful, the opposing team receives the advantage.
Island Challenge - When the teams were separated into Boys and Girls, the advantage earned from The Memory Trial was used in the Island Challenge. They worked as a team, and they faced each other. After they were separated into Sting and Claw, the advantage from The Code Cracker went to the successful team's captain. In the First Round, the captains face each other and go head to head in a bid to win an advantage for their teammates who play against the other team in the second round. Winning the second round means that one adventurer from the triumphant team receives the latest Island Treasure, and is named the most valuable adventurer on the island for that day. Each day, the adventurers have to face different challenges, and this is the most important one – the more Island Treasures the teams win, the bigger advantage they have in the final race to escape from Scorpion Island.
Island Fire - This is where the island communicates with the adventurers. Every night, the teams are summoned to the Island Fire, and everything is revealed there. The Island chooses two Adventurers to captain their teams. Also, the winning team is revealed, and only one adventurer from the winning team gets the island treasure, which is a huge advantage for the teams.  The advantage of the island treasure is revealed towards the end of the series.

Episodes

Day 1 (Episodes 1 & 2)
Captains - Zach (Boys) & Lizzie (Girls)
Island Challenge - Chasm of Chaos
Island Treasure - Silver Eagle (Freedom from the island)

10 adventurers made their way to Scorpion Island by Rescue Speed Boats. Once they arrived, they were given the task to pick a bottle with their name on in the sand. Each bottle contained a parchment which had a number 1 or 2 on it, as well as a mysterious symbol. All girls were on team 1, and the boys were on team 2. The symbols on the parchments were going to be important for each Individual Adventurer. Johny then drew a symbol out of a bag, and that was the same symbol that Peter had, and the boys decided to let the Girls do the Island Challenge first.  The two teams then chose their captains, Lizzie for the girls and Zach for the boys.

Island Challenge - In the heart of the Island, there was a huge ravine with 2 crossings. Lower down was a flimsy bridge which 4 team members will stand holding coloured nets. More than 3 storeys high is a precarious cable, and the captains will have to make their way across this with hoops and monkey bars for balance. Strapped to edge of the wobbly platform are 4 coloured cogs which the captains have to detach one at a time and drop them to the matching coloured net as quickly as possible. If a cog misses a net or otherwise lost, the captain has to go back to the end platform where there are 2 spares of each colour. The team that catches the right cogs in all four of their nets, and then gets their captain to the end the quickest, wins.

In the first round of the Island Challenge, captain Lizzie untied the first cog and got herself above Khadie's net. She dropped it, but missed. Lizzie then got the closet cog, which was for Natty and dropped that one, but also missed the net. Lizzie followed Eleanor's advice, got another nearby cog and got it in Jeremy's net. Lizzie then went for one of the spare cogs, but as she was untieing one, she knocked off another. As she made her way to the other side of the rope, Lizzie missed Natty's net. Meanwhile, the boys were discussing tactics and realised that they should hold the nets far out from them. Carefully, Lizzie collected another spare cog and got it into Eleanor's net. Using the same method, she got another into Khadie's net. As she had used up all her available cogs, Lizzie got confused and wasted time stopping before taking Eleanor's advice again and made her way back to the starting platform. The girls time was 7:40, and managed three out of four cogs.

The Boys team started Chasm of Chaos, and Zach started with the Red Cog straight away, but it missed James's net when the cog got detached from Zach's elbow and bounced off Dilhan's head to the ravine. Zach went straight to the Blue Cog and got it into Peter's net. He then got the Green Cog into Dilhan's net. Zach then collected the Yellow Cog and got it into Jordan's net. Finally, Zach collected another Red Cog to get into James' net, but he missed again. Zach then got the last red cog into James's net.

Camps - Both teams went to look at the Fortune Hunter's Base Camps which he used for shelter and protection, made by his own hands. Since then, they have been left untouched. The first camp was Tree Camp hidden in the dense Jungle, where the Fortune Hunter built machines, in which to plunder the Island. Peter liked it but the Girls did not. On the sunny side of the creek there was River Camp with cool hammocks and a luxurious lagoon. This is where the Fortune Hunter devised his master plans against the Island's defences. The Girls liked River Camp but the Boys also liked it and thought it was 100 times better than Tree Camp.

Island Fire - The adventurers were then summoned to the Island Fire. The Island revealed the Boys had won and chose Zach as their most valuable member. Zach was awarded the first Island Treasure, the Silver Eagle.  Therefore, the Boys were leading 1–0 in terms of who had the most Island Treasures .Along with this the boys then got to choose which camp they would like and chose River Camp, leaving the Girls with Tree Camp.

Day 2 (Episode 3 & 4)
Captains - Jordan (Boys) & Jeremy (Girls)
Island challenge - Under fire
Island Treasure - Cactus (Survival from Extreme Conditions)

Memory Trial - This is the first time that the memory trial was played on Scorpion Island.  First the symbol ring has to be rebuilt.  Whichever team manages to build their ring the quickest then moves onto the second stage, the memory trial where they can earn an advantage for the Island Challenge.  In total, the symbol ring has 26 symbols. The adventurers have 20 seconds to memorize the ring. They will then be presented a group of symbols, but 3 are not on the symbol ring. If they can correctly identify the 3 rouge symbols, they will get an advantage from the Fortune Hunter in the Island Challenge.  In the Memory Trial, both teams start to piece the Fortune Hunter's symbol ring together. Jeremy and Natty were playing for the girls against Jordan and Peter from the Boys.  There was not much communication from the Girls, however the Boys communicated well which led them to victory and through to the second round of the trial.  In the second round of the trial, Peter and Jordan memorized the symbol ring. There was a lot of communication between the 2 and they managed to gain the Fortune Hunter's advantage.  Therefore, the Boys chose the Girls to go first in the island challenge so they could observe the girls and learn from their mistakes.

Island challenge - Tumbling off the edge of a lake, in the heart of the Island are the Venom Cascades, 1 member of each team is suspended above the terrifyingly high wall of water, armed with a net. They will have to use this to catch tennis balls launched to them from a mighty cannon, by 2 of their teammates way below. If a ball is caught, the remaining 2 members of the team will have to haul the suspended adventurer as quickly as possible to the side of the Cascades, so they can try to throw the ball into the collection tub. Each team has 10 minutes to do this, and whichever team has the most balls in their tub at the end of their turn, wins.

The Girls went first due to the Boys advantage. Jeremy was above the Cascades, Lizzie & Khadie on the ropes, and Eleanor & Natty at the cannon. Lizzie & Khadie put Jeremy into place, but the girls' first shot was way too high, however Eleanor & Natty's second shot counted as they scored into the net and dropped it into the tub. Eleanor & Natty started to miss a lot of throws, wasting precious time. The Girls got their second ball in the net, but unfortunately it bounced off and out of the tub. However they got another one in the net, but again Jeremy threw the ball with to much force and bounced off again, meaning Jeremy hadn't learnt from her last mistake. The Girls got another ball in the net and Jeremy got it in the tub. Then the Girls got 3 more balls into the tub and gave the Girls a final score of 5.
The Boys then played 'Under Fire'. Jordan was above the Cascades, Peter & Dilhan on the ropes, and James & Zach at the cannon. The Boys were like the Girls, missing the net & a ball bouncing off the net. However, some balls went in the net and in to the collection tub, matching the Girls score of 5, but the Boys dropped the 5th ball in the tub quicker than the Girls.

Island Fire - The Island Fire announced that the overall winner was the Boys and they chose Jordan as their most valuable adventurer. He was therefore awarded the cactus. The Boys now have a total of 2 Island Treasures and the girls have none.

Day 3 (Episode 5 & 6)
Captains - Khadie (Girls) and Dilhan (Boys)
Island Challenge - Moving Target
Island Treasure - Silver Pit Viper (Danger)

Memory Trial - In the memory trial Khadie chose Eleanor and Dilhan chose Jordan. The  Boys hade a bit of trouble finding the pieces that go together because Jordan thought the ring was the same as last time, so the girls won for the first time. In the memory trial today they had 20 seconds to memorize the symbols on the ring, they were then shown a board with 6 symbols on it, but only 2 were missing off the ring. The missing symbols were the monkey and the sun. The girls recognized these symbols quickly and put them back onto the ring in the right spots. This won them the fortune hunters advantage. The advantage was to choose to go first or second, they chose second.

Island Challenge - In this round colored balls fall down the face of Skeleton Falls every two minutes, at every ball drop one of the suspended adventurers gets raised 1 metre. Another adventurer is on another swing 4 metres away from them throwing the balls into their suspended adventurers net. The other 3 team members are gathering the balls as they drop and putting them into the throwing team members’ bag. The team with the most balls in the net at the end of the game wins.

The boys went first due to the girl's advantage, it was James catching the balls, Peter throwing, and Zach, Jordan and Dilhan gathering the balls. The boys started well, but just before the second drop Peter said his arm was getting tired and it showed. As the game went on Peters throwing was getting worse and worse and after the 3rd ball drop he got barely any balls into James’ net. They ended on 37, but because James hit 1 in with his hand they ended on 36.

The girls then went with Eleanor catching the balls, Lizzie throwing, and Jeremy, Natty and Khadie gathering the balls. The girls started extremely well with Lizzie getting nearly all of them in and got their score up while they were both at even height. As the game progressed Eleanor motivated her team to keep going by cheering them on and Lizzie showed no signs of tiredness, unlike Peter and at the end of the game it was revealed that she had a strong ball playing background from playing baseball and softball. The girls did great with an end score of 78, more than doubling the boys score.

Island Fire - At the island fire, because the girls won they had to choose their most valuable player, they chose Lizzie and she received the silver pit viper. The island decided to unleash a twist into the adventurers' path and it was revealed that the two people who had their symbols vanish from the symbol ring must vanish from their team. It turned out that Jeremy had the sun and Zach had the monkey.  Jeremy and Zach stepped away from their teams and the  island kidnapped them.

Day 4 (Episode 7 & 8)
Captains - Eleanor (Girls) and Peter (Boys)
Island Challenge - Vanishing Point
Island Treasure - Scorpion (Devious)

Memory Trial - In the Memory Trial Eleanor chose Khadie and Peter chose Jordan. The boys seemed to have a bit of trouble finding the last piece that made it complete so the girls won this challenge again. In the memory trial today they had 20 seconds to memorize the symbols on the ring, they were then shown a board with 5 symbols on it, but only 1 was wrong. Eleanor recognized the wrong symbol and quickly and put them back onto the ring in the right spots. This won them the fortune hunters advantage. The advantage was to choose to go first or second, they chose second.

Island Challenge - In this round, two team members are sitting in a trolley balanced on wires five storeys above the ground. They have to pull themselves to the other end of the wires and on their way collect cogs. The remaining two team member then had to winch them back to the other side of the wires where they had to place them onto scales. For every cog they get to the scales lowers their captured team member. They then have to repeat this trying to get all of their cogs onto the scales before time runs out, under 10 minutes, to get their team member back. Whichever team did it the quickest then won the next island treasure.

The boys went first due to the girls advantage, it was Jordan and Peter in the trolley and Dilhan and James winching them back. The boys got to their first cog quite quickly and Zach was encouraging them as he wanted to get out of the cage. They got very tired very quickly but pushed on to set a quick final time of 8:07 and won Zach back.

The girls then went with Natty and Khadie in the trolley and Lizzie and Eleanor winching them back. The girls also started quickly but kept looking more and more tired. By the end they looked absolutely shattered but they powered on, and with only seconds left on their time they finished and won Jeremy back.

Island Fire - At the Island Fire, because the boys put their 5th cog on the scales quicker than the girls the boys won. They then chose Peter as their most valuable team member and he was awarded the scorpion.  This brought the Boys Island Treasures to 3 against the girls' 1.

Then a twist was unleashed. Myleene said “I can now tell you that the scorpion represents the devious side of the island, he has a vicious, vicious sting and also two claws. Legend has it incidentally that only one team can escape from Scorpion Island, and that team can only be either team Sting or team Claw. So there will no longer be girls against boys, tomorrow you will play a challenge and then the new team captains will choose  their teams."

Day 5 (Episode 9 & 10)
Captains - Natty and James
Island challenge - The Divider
Island Treasure -  Silver Crab (Guarded Nature of the Island)

Memory Trial - In the Memory Trial, Natty chose Khadie, and James chose Zach. The girls put the symbol ring together before the boys and won the right to play for the advantage. Today they had 10 seconds to memorize the symbols to then identify the one that changes. After arguing about it Natty made the captains decision and chose the sun, it was wrong so the advantage then went to the boys. As the boys won the fortune hunters advantage by default they were quite happy about going into the challenge, the advantage was one extra shot in the next challenge, but for only one person.

Island Challenge - For the first time since arriving on the island all adventurers were competing as individuals. In the heart of Scorpion Island a massive target is suspended 7 metres high and the adventurers must launch themselves across to it using a giant rope swing. Each adventurer then has 3 throws at the board trying to get as close as possible using paint filled rocks. But if the rocks don't smash then that throw is not counted, and the adventurer from each team that's gets the closest will become the first captain for either sting or claw. Also out of them two captain winning throws the one who got the closest to the bulls eye wins the next Island Treasure, The Silver Crab.

In the first round the girls went with Natty swinging first, and with her third swing she threw her rock with enough force to smash and got it right in the middle. Next was Eleanor but with not enough force as none of her rocks smashed. It was then Lizzie and with her strong ball background was a great contender, but still couldn't beat Natty's best throw. Jeremy was next but didn't manage to get any in the target circle. Last was Khadie but she couldn't beat Natty either, so with no one beating Natty's bulls eye she was awarded captain.

Next were the boys and with winning the fortune hunters advantage had to choose one team member to award one extra shot to. They chose Jordan so when it came to his turn he had 4 shots at the target instead of 3. The first adventurer swinging for the boys was James, but his rocks didn't smash even though he threw his rock quite close to the centre of the target. Next was Zach and with his second throw he got quite close to the target centre, he then said to James that he crushed the rocks in his hand so they would easily smash. It was then Peter and with all his rocks smashing he was lucky but none of them were as close as Zach's. Dilhan was next and only threw his rocks near the bottom. Last was Jordan with his 4 shots, but when he was preparing to throw his third rock he put his finger in the rock, and with all his throws barely managed to hit the board.

Island Fire - The Island Fire the island decided that because Zach and Jordan crushed their rocks they had an advantage over the others, so only where the rock hit was counted instead of the splats. So with this in play the captains were changed, it should have been Natty and Zach, but it was awarded to Natty and James. And because Natty hit closest, she was awarded the silver crab and choice of teams where she wanted to be Captain of Sting with James awarded Captain of Claw.

Day 6 (Episode 11 & 12)
Captains - Natty (Sting) & James (Claw)
Island Challenge - Flight of fear
Island Treasure -  Silver Butterfly (Change)

At yesterday's Island Fire, Natty & James won the honour of being the first team captains, but also had task to choose their teammates due to their position as first captains of Sting and Claw. The Adventurers came up 2 at a time in order of who hit closest to the centre of the target in The Divider(Island Challenge on day 5). Natty had the first choice between Zach & Peter, she struggled but eventually chose Peter meaning that Zach joined James. Then James chose between Dilhan & Jordan, choosing Dilhan so Jordan joined Natty. It was then Natty's choice between Lizzie & Khadie, Natty decided to pick Khadie so Lizzie joined James. James then had the last choice between Eleanor & Jeremy, he struggled and ended up choosing Eleanor meaning that Natty got Jeremy.
Team Sting: Natty (Silver Crab); Peter (Scorpion); Jordan (Cactus); Khadie and Jeremy.
Team Claw: James; Zach (Silver Eagle); Dilhan; Lizzie (Silver Pit Viper) and Eleanor.
Sting now has 3 Island Treasures compared to Claws' 2. The adventurers who won treasures while in Boys or Girls took them to their new teams.  After the teams were chosen the 2 captains had to decide who got which camp.  Both of them wanted the camps where they had been so Sting got Tree camp and Claw got River camp.

Code Cracker - Natty chose a familiar member, Khadie while James chose Lizzie. Natty & Khadie had solved the puzzle quicker and went through to the second round.  Adventurers will only be given 1 letter that relates to 1 symbol. It is then up to them, to use the rest of the wheel to spell out a message from the Fortune Hunter that contains a 3-digit code. The Adventurers have 5 minutes to work out the message and win an advantage in the First Round of Flight of Fear.  Natty was at the ring and Khadie was at the board describing the symbols to Natty.  One by one Natty described the symbol to Khadie who told Natty the corresponding letter.  Minutes later they swapped positions. Khadie accidentally spun the wheel but she got it back in line.  Both of them solved the code 377 from the Fortune Hunters Message "First enter one three followed by two sevens".  Therefore, Sting won a 10-second time advantage in the Island Challenge.

Island challenge - In the First Round, the captains will have to climb up the fixed ladders attached to one of the trees, before swinging across to angle cable ladders to collect Giant Cogs. They then have to deliver these cogs into collection tubs at the base of the tree, and the captain who gets all 8 Cogs in their collection tubs first, wins. In the Second Round, one team member will have to climb up an angled cable ladder, collecting Giant Cogs one at a time, before passing them to their teammate who is climbing a matching cable ladder on the other side of the Forest Clearing. To make these passes, they have to swing towards each other. Once the cogs have been passed across, the second team member has to deliver it in the collection tub at the base of their angled ladder. If the Cog hits the ground it is out of play, and if an adventurer completely loses momentum and can not reach either ladder, they will be lowered right back to the ground.  Both teams have 8 minutes to deliver as many cogs as possible, and whichever team has the most cogs in their collection tub when the time runs out wins.

In the First Round of Flight of Fear, Natty was ahead of James due to Team Sting's 10 second head start. Natty was in the lead for a third of the challenge, but James caught up with and taken the lead. However, James' couldn't reach the cable ladder, meaning Natty was back in the lead, but James finally reaches the cable ladder. James then struggled to keep hold of the cable ladder while trying to untie a cog. Natty then struggled to reach the fixed ladder and James lost momentum and was lowered back down. Natty again can't reach the fixed ladder, pushing James into the lead again, meaning James zoomed down the ladder and threw his cog into the tub, and James won the advantage for Claw in the Second Round.

In the Second Round, Claw went first with Lizzie and Zach, and their technique was to get the top cog first. Lizzie & Zach weren't communicating. Zach struggled to pass the first cog to Lizzie, so he threw it and Lizzie missed it. Zach decided to throw  the second cog and Lizzie made a successful catch. However Lizzie & Zach weren't listening to the rest of Claw, when they shouted 'Don't throw it!' and the pair decide to keep on throwing the cogs. Another cog was wasted by Team Claw because Zach thrown the cog too early. Lizzie started to struggle after she dropped the second cog into the tub, as her fingers were hurting, and the last cog bounced off the tub. Claw ended up with a total of 2. Next was Sting, and unlike Claw, Khadie & Peter started at the bottom cog. Peter then threw the first cog but Khadie missed and it went between her legs. Peter's next swing was late, however Khadie caught the cog. This streak started to continue before Khadie lost momentum and lowered back down. In last seconds of the challenge, Khadie managed to drop a cog into the cog from a long distance. Sting had 4 cogs at the end of the challenge, doubling Claw's score.

Island Fire - In the Island Fire, it was revealed that Sting won, and Sting chose Khadie as their most valuable member. Khadie was awarded the Silver Butterfly.  This brought the Island Treasure count to 4–2 to Sting.

Day 7 (Episode 13 and 14)
Captains - Jeremy and Eleanor
Island Challenge - Double Crossing
Island Treasure - Venus Flytrap (Trickery of the Island)

Code Cracker – In the code cracker today, Jeremy chose Khadie and Eleanor chose Dilhan. Today was closer with both teams only having the last piece to place, but sting found it and first and put the ring together quicker than claw. Today they had 5 minutes to crack the code, but with everything going on Jeremy accidentally turns the wheel out of place, luckily Khadie quickly spotted this so none of the letters were written wrong otherwise they would have had the wrong letters and finished with the wrong code. After this little slip up they quickly worked together and ended up with the winning code radar and this won them the fortune hunters advantage. The advantage was for their team captain Jeremy to start with 1 rusty cog already tied on ahead of claws captain Eleanor.

Island Challenge – In the first round, one captain is on the sturdier platform pounding boulders with cogs tied on them to the other team's captain, who is on the less sturdy platform trying to get all of the rusty cogs off the boulders and to the end to tie them onto the rope. If a captain is knocked off the platform then the other team scores 3 points or if the cog is knocked out of their hands then that cog is out of play and that is 1 less point they can score. Whichever captain gets all of their cogs tied on the rope or as many as they can in the quickest time wins an advantage for their team. 
In the second round one team must run across the less sturdy platform carrying rusty cogs one at a time while the other team swings boulders at them trying to push them off during the 10-minute time limit. For each cog taken across a point is earned, but if one falls off, the team is deducted 3 points from their total. The team that earns the most points wins the next island treasure.

In the first round Eleanor went first and started well. She soon realized that it was harder for Jeremy to knock her off if she crawled along the platform, so she was quite slow to get from one end of the runway to the other but she quickly got the hang of it. She got the cogs easily and quickly and was not shaken by the boulders being thrown at her by Jeremy. After she got the first cog on the rope Jeremy threw a boulder at her and she caught it, so she had 2 rusty cogs on the rope in a very short amount of time. As the game went on Eleanor never looked tired, worked well and finished with over 1 minute to spare. Jeremy then went and started like Eleanor by crawling and started well, but quickly slowed down. When she was taking a rusty cog to the end she did what Eleanor did and caught the boulder thrown on the end which saved her time. By the end she looked tired and was slower than Eleanor but because of the fortune hunters advantage, she had an extra cog tied on already so she won with only seconds left on the clock. So Jeremy won the advantage for team sting in the second round.

In the second round, because Jeremy won the advantage she got to choose if team sting ran the cogs or threw the boulders; she chose running the cogs because that was the easiest way to gain points. With everyone from each team playing apart from the captains, everyone wanted to win even more than normal. Sting started well and quickly earned 2 points, then Dilhan threw a boulder at Peter and he lost his balance and went smashing into the water, so the scores were then 2-3. As the game went on sting kept their balance and were going well until Zach hit Jordan right at the very end of the runway, earning claw another 3 points. The score was now 8–6, so the whole game come down to the last run because if claw knocked Khadie down then they would have 9 points and win the game, but if Khadie was able to run the cog to the other end without getting knocked down then sting would win with 9 points. Khadie succeeded, of course as she is a strong competitor, so sting won 9–6.

Island Fire – In the Island Fire, Sting won, because Jeremy was captain and the only person in Sting without an Island Treasure, they all chose her, so Jeremy was awarded with the Venus Flytrap.  This helped extend Sting's lead to 5–2 in terms of Island Treasures.

Day 8 (Episode 15 & 16)
Captains - Peter and Lizzie
Island Challenge - Jig Zag,
Island Treasure - Vampire Bat (Be Alert)

Code Cracker- In the Code Cracker, Peter chose Khadie and Lizzie chose Eleanor. Lizzie bought controversy when she picked Eleanor over Zach, because he wanted to attempt as he hasn't tried and he isn't playing the island challenge. Lizzie and Eleanor were arguing, with the rest of their team, which gave Sting the advantage. Today they had 5 minutes to crack the code with the clue of 3 sea birds, but there were only 3 symbols on the wheel, so with them symbols they had to figure out the first word, then with them letters it would spell out the next 2 words. They were quickly stuck and Khadie did not know what to do, and even when Peter figured out the first word of seagull, she was still confused and didn't write it in the right spot. Even when Peter knew what the word was he did not take control, so sting failed the code cracker so the fortune hunters advantage was given to claw by default, and if they had of worked together properly and Peter have taken the captaincy seriously the code would have been seagull, pelican and penguin. So claw won the fortune hunters advantage, the advantage was for Lizzie to start 10 seconds before Peter when they go head to head.

Island challenge - In the first round, the team captain must get large puzzle pieces and make their way up a ladder and fit them onto a grid inside the puzzle that the other team members would be putting together. The captain that completes the puzzle first wins.

In the second round, two team members must pass large puzzle pieces to the other on a ladder and fit them onto a grid. The team that completes the puzzle first wins. The team that does this quicker wins the next island treasure.

In the first round Lizzie had the 10 second head start and started by putting the puzzle together at ground level. Then when Peter started he did the same thing, and after a minute or so the captains looked confused and didn't look like they were getting anywhere. Then finally Peter started putting his puzzle on the board before Lizzie, but she caught back up fast because she had longer legs than him. Peter did very well but just not enough to beat Lizzie, so she won the advantage for team claw in round 2.

In the second round, because Lizzie won the first round team claw started with a piece of the puzzle already in place on the board. Neither of the teams did what their captains did and started on the ground, they both started putting pieces on the board straight away and this started confusion later on. Team claw was in the lead most of the way, but in the dying seconds of the game team sting overtook them and finished only seconds before claw, they were shattered.

Island Fire - At the Island Fire, Team Sting won and chose Natty as their most valuable adventurer. Natty was awarded her second island treasure, The Vampire Bat.  This further extended Sting's Island Treasure lead to 6–2.

Day 9 (Episode 17 & 18)
Captains - Jordan (Sting) & Zach (Claw)
Island challenge - Hard Wired
Island Treasure - Coral Sponge (Knowledge)

Code Cracker - Jordan chose Khadie and Zach chose Dilhan.  Sting managed to once again complete the ring first and then managed to complete the code.  This earned Jordan the advantage of one fuse already in the storage container for the island challenge, therefore giving him an advantage over Zach

Island challenge - In the first round the captains had to remove fuses from a board.  They were suspended on elastic ropes and had to use ropes to climb down and retrieve the fuses.  Once they had a fuse they then had to throw them into a storage container, in order for a fuse to count the whole of it had to enter the box.  As soon as they let go of the rope they got flung back to the top.

In the first round of the Island challenge Jordan from Sting was against Zach from Claw.  Jordan started with 1 fuse in his storage container as he had won this advantage in the code cracker.

In the second round of the Island challenge Jeremy, Natty & Peter from Sting were against James, Lizzie & Eleanor from Claw.

Island Fire - Sting won this challenge and awarded the coral sponge to Jordan as they thought that he was their most valuable player.  This made the Island Treasure count 7–2 to Sting.

Day 10 (Episode 19 & 20)
Captains - Khadie (Sting) & Dilhan (Claw)
Island challenges - Rings of Steel, Waterfall and Tower of Stones (main challenge)
Island Treasure - Clam (Scheming)

Code Cracker - Khadie & Natty from Sting vs. Dilhan & Eleanor from Claw.  Claw earned the 5 second advantage for the final Island Challenge by default as Khadie and Natty were unsuccessful in solving code cracker

Island Challenges - Today the Island decided to turn up the heat and pressure on the adventurers.  Therefore, instead of the usual code cracker followed by the captain's island challenge and then the teams' Island Challenge there were multiple challenges.  The first challenge was the Rings of Steel.  The chosen adventurers had to hold 2 rings that each weigh the size of 10 fizzy cans, holding them horizontally. Whoever can hold the rings longest wins.  The Island chose the 2 captains to take part and go head to head in this challenge.  Khadie struggled from the start of this challenge and although she tried her best Dilhan proved that he had better strength and stamina by not letting his arms drop down.  Therefore, Dilhan won his teammates a 5-second advantage in the final Island Challenge of the day, Tower of Stones.

The second Island Challenge Waterfall then took place.  Up for grabs was a 5-second time advantage in Tower of Stones.  There were 3 holes in a wall and 1 adventurer sat 1 side and the other had 3 chances to soak the other player with a bucket of water.  After each bucket was emptied the seated adventurer could choose to stay in the same place or move.  Jordan from Sting played against James from Claw.  To start with James was pouring and Jordan was seated.  James soaked Jordan with his second bucket.  When the 2 adventurers switched round Jordan managed to get James twice, therefore earning Sting a 5-second advantage in the next Island Challenge.

For the final, and main, Island Challenge of the day Peter took on Eleanor at the Tower of Stones.  There were three tables and on the end one was a stack of 4 different sized circles, largest on bottom to smallest on top.  The adventurers had to transfer the wooden circles onto the other end table while moving only one at a time and only allowed to put a smaller circle on top of a larger one.  The adventurer that did this in the quickest time would win the challenge.  Due to the earlier challenges Claw, Eleanor, had a 10-second advantage meaning that 10 seconds would be taken of her final time.  Sting only had a 5-second advantage so Peter had 5 seconds taken off his final time.  Eleanor went first and started at a really fast pace and managed to complete the puzzle fairly quickly but in a large number of moves.  Peter then went, he had not been allowed to watch Eleanor, he started at a really fast pace then stopped mid game to think.  This helped him a lot and enabled him to finish in fewer moves then Eleanor.  Even with the time advantages deducted Peter still won, although it was very close.

Island Fire -  This mean that Sting won the Island Challenge and Island Treasure.  Sting then awarded the Treasure, clam, to Peter due to his performance in the Tower of Stones.  This made the Island Treasure count 8–2 in Sting's favour.  The 2 teams chose their final team captains, Natty for Sting and Dilhan for Claw.  These captains led the team on the final 2 days.

Day 11 (Episode 21 & 22)
Captains - Natty (Sting) and Dilhan (Claw)
Island Challenge - Sinking Swamp
Island Treasure - Conch Shell (Communication)

Code Cracker - Natty chose Jordan and Dilhan chose James to take part in the last code cracker.  As this was the last code cracker it was the hardest ring to solve.  Claw managed to finish the puzzle first and go on to win the challenge.  Therefore, in the first round of the Island Challenge Dilhan started with 3 balls, meaning 3 points, in his basket giving him a 3-point head start over Natty.

Island challenge - 1 adventurer is trying to throw balls into a basket while the other is defending the basket with a bat.  The attacking player has ball sticks at 3 different lily pads and can move between them at any stage of the game.  The defending player has 2 lily pads that are further apart but closer to the basket.  For every ball that goes into the basket 1 point is given.  If the attacking player falls in 3 points are subtracted from their score, if the defending player falls in 3 points are added to the opponents score.

For the first Stage it was Natty against Dilhan with Dilhan on 3 points at the start.  Natty was attacking first.  Dilhan was second and proved to be better at aiming and at bluffing which earned him the win.  Neither adventurer fell in so no penalty points were enforced.  Dilhan therefore won his teammates a 3-point head start in the second part of the Island Challenge.

For the second part it was Khadie and Jeremy of Sting against James and Zach of Claw.  For this round there were 3 piles of balls: 1 for Sting, 1 for Claw and 1 mixed.  These were attached to Lily pads.  James and Jeremy were using these lily pads to throw balls to Zach and Khadie who were on a choice of 3 other lily pads.  They then had to throw their balls into their buckets.  Whoever got the most points at the end of the game would win.  The same penalties as the first round were implemented, minus 3 points for falling in.  Claw worked much better in this task and Khadie had trouble staying balanced and on the pads.  Claw therefore won and in doing so earned their first Island Treasure since becoming a team.  They decided to award the Conch Shell to Dilhan as they thought that he was their most valuable player.  This changed the Island Treasure count to 8–3 to Sting.  Although the score was vastly in Sting's favour this win helped Claw bond as a team and start working brilliantly as a unit as they realised they could win while having fun at the same time.

Island Fire - At the Island fire the importance and role of the Island treasures was revealed.  For the first round of the Final escape the teams would have to carry and transport each other's treasures.  This meant that Claw had to transport 8 whereas Sting only had 3.

Day 12 (Episode 23, 24, 25 & 26)
Captains - Natty (Sting) & Dilhan (Claw)
Island Challenge - The Escape, rounds 1 - 4
The Escape, Round 1 - The final escape was split into 4 rounds, or stages.  The winner of each round earns an advantage for the next.  The first round was the Descent.  This was a head to head battle between 1 adventurer from each team.  The pairs of adventurers were drawn from a bag and each adventurer was represented by their symbols that they were first given when they arrived on the island.  The captains had to transport one of the other teams treasures.  For this challenge the adventurers had to abseil a cliff face to the beach below. As soon as one adventurer finished the time it took for the other adventurer to get down was then used as a headstart for the next.  The first pair of adventurers were Natty from Sting against Lizzie from Claw.  Natty had to transport an Island treasure and her dislike of heights was clear, therefore Lizzie won this challenge.  The next pairing was Peter from Sting against James from Claw, Lizzie's win meant that James had a 32-second headstart.  This enabled James to nearly reach the bottom before Peter could even start.  Therefore, James won, however Peter cut the headstart down to 28 seconds.  The third race saw Khadie take on the Claw team captain Dilhan.  Dilhan won this and passed on a time advantage to the next member Zach who was against Sting member Jeremy.  Zach won this which meant that it was Down top Jordan of Sting and Eleanor from Claw to see who would win this stage of the escape.  Instead of this being a straight race the last pair of adventurers had to tie the opposing team's treasures onto a rope and send them down to their other team members one at a time.  Eleanor started this round first due to her time advantage.  However Jordan only had to pass down 2 treasures compared to Eleanor's 7.  Therefore, Jordan finished this very quickly and it took Eleanor about 2 minutes 30 seconds longer.  This was then Jordan's head start for the descent.  Jordan chose to take his time and approach the descent with caution, however due to the time advantage he managed to still finish before Eleanor started.  Eleanor then descended quickly as Claw could not continue without all of its members.  As Sting won this round they then earned a head start in round 2.
The Escape, Round 2 - This involved all members of both teams.  It was now time for the Treasures to be returned to the Island.  Each team was given a metal detector to find the metal cases for each treasure that were buried at the beach.  Although Sting had the time advantage they worked very badly as a team and were constantly arguing while looking completely demotivated.  However Claw were desperate to win and gave this challenge their all.  Claw started with a vast disadvantage as they had to return 8 treasures compared to Sting's 3.  Due to their strong teamwork they managed to bury 5 and accidentally located one of Sting's enabling Sting to return one of their treasures.  This made the final score 3–2 with Claw still having 3 treasures compared to Sting's 2.  Therefore, even though Claw returned more treasures Sting won this round as they had less treasures remaining.  Sting therefore earned a 10-second advantage for the third round of the final escape.
The Escape, Round 3 - A long length of rope was wound round 4 poles in a figure of 8. The adventurers had to untie this and then retrieve the key that was at the end.  Sting started this round 10 seconds ahead of Claw due to the advantage that they won in the previous round.  However Claw unwound their rope first due to better teamwork, method and communication.  But both teams got their key at exactly the same moment.  Therefore, the Island decided that it was a draw.  Therefore, for the final round of the escape both teams would start at the same time giving both teams an equal chance to escape.
The Escape, Round 4 - Once again it was the whole of Team Claw against Team Sting.  Using the keys that they won in the last round a member of each team unlocked a chest that was floating on the sea.  In the chest was a bucket.  Each adventurer had a bucket, with holes in the bottom, and formed a relay within their team.  The last adventurer in the team poured the water into 1 of their 3 containers.  Each team had 3 containers each containing a key.  One of these three keys would open the chest that contains the fortune hunter's diary, whichever team achieved this would win and escape from Scorpion Island.

Team Sting had Khadie in the sea starting the relay followed by, Peter, Jeremy, Jordan and Natty pouring water into their containers.  Team Claw had Zach in the water then Dilhan, Eleanor, James and Lizzie filling up the container.  Both teams really struggled to pass water along the line and into the container due to the hole in the bucket.  However both teams were determined and worked really well together.  Claw managed to fill up 1 of their containers first.  Lizzie then rushed over to the chest and tried her key in the lock.  Unfortunately for Lizzie and Claw the key did not open the chest.  Claw then started filling up their next container and managed to get halfway until Sting filled their first.  Natty then rushed to the chest and tried the key in the lock.  Fortunately for Sting their key worked.  Therefore, Team Sting won the final round and escaped.  For the first time in Scorpion Island history it is Sting who won and escaped, whilst for Claw they realised that one team had to lose and knew that it was all about having fun on the day.

Similarities with previous series
 Team Sting and Team Claw are once again the main teams
 There are 10 adventurers, as in series 1 and series 4
 Myleene Klass and Johny Pitts presented their second series
 Filmed in the same location as series 4 Tallebudgera Valley, Queensland, Australia
 Filmed at the same time as series 4 in April 2010
 Once again had a combination of Australian and UK children taking part, 6 from UK 4 from Australia
This is the first time that Sting have escaped as in all four previous series Claw were the team to escape from Scorpion Island.

Challenges that appeared in previous series
Lots of the challenges that appeared in series 5 were very similar to those in series 4 but with slight changes and a change of name.  This most likely happened as they were filmed at the same location at the same time.

 Chasm of Chaos (series 5, day 1) - Reckless Ravine (series 4, day 2).  Coloured cogs replace dice
 Under Fire (series 5, day 2) - Edge of Doom (series 4, Day 3, round 2).  Tennis balls replaced darts
 Moving Target (series 5, day 3) - Danger Dunk (series 4, day 4, round 2).
 Vanishing Point (series 5, day 4)- Tracks of Terror (series 4, day 5, round 2).  Cogs were used instead of water
 The Divider (series 5, day 5) - The Pendulum (series 4, day 6, round 1).  Adventurers threw rocks at a target instead of grabbing tiles
 Flight of Fear (series 5, day 6) - Leap of Faith (series 4, day 7, round 2)
 Double Crossing (series 5, day 7) - Splashdown (series 4, day 8).  Cogs are used instead of dice
 Jig Zag (series 5, day 8)- Perilous puzzle (series 4, day 9).  Inner part is completed by 1 player and the outer is completed by the team in round 2 in series 5, it is the other way round in series 4
 Hard Wired (series 5, day 9) - The Bone Collector (series 4, day 10).  Series 5: round 1 = captain retrieving + round 2 = team replacing, series 4: round 1 = team removing + round 2 = individual replacing
 Rings of Steel (series 5, day 10) - The Scarecrow (series 4, day 2, Totem trial).  Only 1 go and team captains against each other
 Waterfall (series 5, day 10)- Line of Fire (series, day 11, Totem Trial)
 Tower of Stones (series 5, day 10) - Pyramid Puzzle (series 4, day 4, Totem trial).  1Vs1 instead of Sting Vs Claw

Facts
 This is the first and only time that Sting escaped and Claw didn't. 
 This is the first time since Series 2 where more than one Australian adventurer has escaped as well as the first time ever to involve both a male and a female. 
 Natty, Jordan and Peter are the only adventurers to win an Island Treasure more than once.
 James and Eleanor are the only adventurers to never win an Island Treasure. 
 Khadie and Lizzie are the only adventurers to win an Island Teasure without being captain. 
 Jordan is the only adventurer to win an Island Treasure despite losing himself, in this case the Coral Sponge in Hard Wired where he lost the first round to Zach of Claw. 
 Lizzie is the first disabled adventurer to appear on Escape from Scorpion Island as she was born profoundly deaf in her right ear and has to wear a cochlear implant as a result. 
 Natty is the first Jewish adventurer to appear on Escape from Scorpion Island. 
 James is the first Welsh adventurer to appear on Escape from Scorpion Island. 
 Peter is the first adventurer of East Asian descent to appear on Escape from Scorpion Island. 
 Coincidentally in Vanishing Point, the adventurers that went on the trolley became members of Sting while the adventurers that winched them back became members of Claw. 
 It is revealed by Peter that Natty's real name is Natanya when picking who would compete in the second round of Jig Zag for Sting. Peter would refer to her by her real name again when discussing Sting's performance after said challenge. 
 In the Day 10 challenges for reasons unknown, the male adventurers wore their navy rainjackets when they were part of the Boys while the female adventurers wore their green rainjackets when they were part of the Girls despite this being Sting vs. Claw and not Boys vs. Girls and that they already have rainjackets for these teams. 
 Sinking Swamp is the only challenge to not be based on a challenge from the previous series.
 In Sinking Swamp, only female members of Sting and male members of Claw competed in this challenge.

External links
 https://www.bbc.co.uk/cbbc/scorpionisland/
 http://www.abc.net.au/abc3/scorpionisland/

2011 British television seasons